Stepney Green is a London Underground station located on Mile End Road in Stepney, London, United Kingdom. It is between Whitechapel and Mile End on the District line and the Hammersmith & City line, and is in Travelcard Zone 2.

History
The station was opened in 1902 by the Whitechapel and Bow Railway, a joint venture between the District Railway and the London, Tilbury and Southend Railway. The new railway connected the District Railway at Whitechapel with the London, Tilbury and Southend at Bow.

Electrified District Railway services started in 1905. Hammersmith and City line services (then part of the Metropolitan line) started in 1936. The station passed to London Underground in 1950.

The Hammersmith & City line was extended from Whitechapel to Barking via Stepney Green permanently in 2009 due to Crossrail and work at Whitechapel station.

Design
It is a sub-surface station with two platforms. The ticket office is above ground and connected to the platforms by stairs. The layout and design of the station is largely unchanged with many original features intact.

Services

Hammersmith & City line
This is the general off-peak frequency.

6 tph eastbound to Barking
6 tph westbound to Hammersmith via King's Cross and Wood Lane

District line

This is the general off-peak frequency. During peak times trains also operate to Wimbledon. During off-peak times, 3 trains per hour from Wimbledon terminate at Barking (as of December 2014).

3 tph eastbound to Barking
6 tph westbound to Ealing Broadway
6 tph westbound to Richmond
3 tph westbound to Wimbledon

Circle line
There is no regular service however there are two trains per day that run from Barking to Edgware Road via Victoria before 6 AM. (as of February 2015.)

2 tpd westbound to Edgware Road via Victoria

Location
Stepney Green is one of the two stations (the other being Mile End) serving the nearby Mile End campus of Queen Mary, University of London, with a station located each side of it.

Connections
London Buses routes 25, 205, 309 and night routes N25 and N205 serve the station.

See also 
 Stepney Green Park

References

External links

Hammersmith & City line stations
District line stations
Tube stations in the London Borough of Tower Hamlets
Former Whitechapel and Bow Railway stations
Railway stations in Great Britain opened in 1902
Stepney